Asolene platae is a species of freshwater snail in the family Ampullariidae, first described by William George Maton in 1811.

Distribution 
The species is native to the Río de la Plata basin. They are also found in the pet trade where they are often sold under the name zebra apple snails.

Reproduction 
A. platae is a gonochoric species which lays its eggs underwater in a gelatinous mass.

References 

Gastropods described in 1811
Endemic fauna of Argentina
Molluscs of Argentina